Boldyn Gankhaich (born 22 February 1995) is a Mongolian judoka. She competed in the women's 63 kg event at the 2020 Summer Olympics held in Tokyo, Japan.

She is the 2019 Asian-Pacific Judo Championships silver medallist in the -63 kg class.

References

External links
 

1995 births
Living people
Mongolian female judoka
Judoka at the 2018 Asian Games
Asian Games competitors for Mongolia
Judoka at the 2020 Summer Olympics
Olympic judoka of Mongolia
21st-century Mongolian women